William Fisher (June 17, 1890 – March 9, 1985) was an American painter. His work was part of the painting event in the art competition at the 1948 Summer Olympics.

References

1890 births
1985 deaths
20th-century American painters
American male painters
Olympic competitors in art competitions
Artists from Brooklyn
20th-century American male artists